Giacomo Paladini (died 1470) was an Italian Roman Catholic prelate who served as Bishop of Forlì (1463–1470).

Biography
On 18 September 1463, Giacomo Paladini was appointed during the papacy of Pope Pius II as Bishop of Forlì.
On 27 November  1463, he was consecrated bishop by Ventura degli Abbati, Bishop of Bertinoro, with Antonio Malatesta, Bishop of Cesena, and Bartolomeo Gandolfi, Bishop of Faenza, serving as co-consecrators. 
He served as Bishop of Forlì until his death in 1470.

References

External links 
 (for Chronology of Bishops) 
 (for Chronology of Bishops)  

15th-century Italian Roman Catholic bishops
Bishops appointed by Pope Pius II
1470 deaths
Bishops of Forlì